Apet or APET may refer to

 Apet, a former romanization of Egyptian Ipet ("The Nurse"), a hippo-headed protective goddess closely associated or conflated with Taweret
 apet, a former romanization of Egyptian ipet or ip.t, an Ancient Egyptian unit of volume
 APET, an abbreviation of "amorphous polyethylene terephthalate"